The following is a list of Registered Historic Places in Keweenaw County, Michigan.



Early history
Copper was discovered in the Keweenaw in the 1830s; soon after, the US government built Fort Wilkins near Copper Harbor to maintain order in the area. Keweenaw County was split off from Houghton County in 1861, with the county seat in Eagle River.  The early government and commercial buildings in Eagle River are now a Historic District.  Isle Royale, although split off into its own county in 1875, was reunited with Keweenaw County ten years later, and remains part of the county.

Mining
Like Houghton County to the south, Keweenaw County's history includes much reference to copper mining. In particular, one of the earliest mines in the area, the prehistoric Minong Mine on Isle Royale, is listed as a historic district.  In addition, the Central Mine and its Methodist Church are also listed on the historic register.

Shipping and transportation
However, with the greatest Great Lake, Lake Superior, surrounding the peninsula, and multiple natural harbors, Keweenaw County's history is much more entwined in shipping and transportation. Nineteen of the properties listed—over half—were directly related to Great Lakes shipping. These include nine lighthouses in Lake Superior: Copper Harbor Light, Eagle Harbor Light, Gull Rock Light Station, Isle Royale Light, Manitou Island Light Station, Passage Island Light, Rock Harbor Light, Rock of Ages Light, and Sand Hills Light. In addition, the wrecks of ten ships around Isle Royale are on the Register: The SS Algoma, SS America, SS Chester A. Congdon, PS Cumberland, SS Emperor, George M. Cox, SS Glenlyon, SS Henry Chisholm, SS Kamloops, and the SS Monarch.

In addition, the listings contain three road bridges built in the 1930s: the M-26–Cedar Creek Culvert, the M-26–Silver River Culvert, and the US 41–Fanny Hooe Creek Bridge. Finally, the Houghton County Traction Company Ahmeek Streetcar Station, an interurban rail station, represents local transportation in the Keweenaw.

Tourism
As the mining industry in the Keweenaw ran down, tourism in the area increased. This was evidenced by the increase in passenger ships (notably the SS America, mentioned above) and the construction of tourist hotels and summer cottages such as the Johns Hotel, the first resort on Isle Royale, and the Keweenaw Mountain Lodge and Golf Course Complex, built in 1933–34. Also in the 1930s, the roads accessing the Keweenaw communities were improved, with the addition of bridges such as the US 41–Fanny Hooe Creek Bridge.

Listings

|}

See also
 List of Michigan State Historic Sites in Keweenaw County
 List of National Historic Landmarks in Michigan
 National Register of Historic Places listings in Michigan
 Listings in neighboring counties: Houghton

References

Keweenaw County
Keweenaw County, Michigan